"Cabaret" is a song recorded by American singer and songwriter Justin Timberlake for his fourth studio album, The 20/20 Experience – 2 of 2 (2013). Featuring a rap verse by Canadian rapper Drake, the song was written and produced by Timberlake, Timothy "Timbaland" Mosley, Jerome "J-Roc" Harmon and Daniel Jones, with additional writing from James Fauntleroy and Drake. "Cabaret" is a pop and soul song which features beatboxing, handclapping, guitars and keyboards in its composition. Music critics noted its similarity to Timbaland's earlier works with singer Aaliyah and Timberlake's 2006 single "My Love". Lyrically, it finds the singer comparing his love to a burlesque and features sexually oriented lyrics.

"Cabaret" received generally positive reviews from contemporary critics who praised Timbaland's production as well as Drake's rap verse on the song. As a result of the strong digital downloads following the release of the album, the track debuted on the charts in South Korea and the United States. It peaked at number 18 on the US R&B Songs chart and number 50 on the South Korean Gaon Chart, selling over 3,800 digital copies for the week in the latter country. Timberlake included "Cabaret" on the set list of his fourth worldwide concert tour entitled The 20/20 Experience World Tour (2013-2014).

Writing and production 

"Cabaret" was written by Timberlake, Timothy "Timbaland" Mosley, Aubrey Graham, Jerome "J-Roc" Harmon, James Fauntleroy and Daniel Jones. The song was produced by Timbaland, Timberlake and Harmon while Jones provided additional production. Elliot Ives recorded the song at the Jungle City Studios in New York City. Timberlake arranged and produced his vocals. Harmon provided keyboards for the song, while Ives played the guitar. The track was engineered by Chris Godbey and mixed by Jimmy Douglass, Godbey and Timberlake; for the process they were assisted by Matt Webber. The keyboards were provided by Harmon and Jones.

Composition and lyrical interpretation 

"Cabaret" is a pop and soul song with a length of four minutes and thirty-three seconds (the shortest song on The 20/20 Experience - 2 of 2) that features "stuttering beatboxing". Kyle Anderson of Entertainment Weekly noted that the song builds a symphony of mouth noises and compared it to Aaliyah's 1998 single "Are You That Somebody?" Brad Stern of MTV Buzzworthy agreed with Anderson, however, labeled "Cabaret"  "as a much more 'dirty-minded'" version of the former. ABC News' Allan Raible noticed the song's beat has a classic sounding Timbaland beat, which—according to him— "the kind of beat Aaliyah used to turn into gold". Arasia Graham of HipHopDX stated that "Cabaret" sounds like a 2013 answer to Timberlake's 2006 single "My Love".

Mikael Wood of Los Angeles Times stated that "Cabaret" is a "percolating bedroom jam that depicts sex as a form of at-home theater". Boston Globe'''s Sarah Rodman called the song a "sexed-up jam". HitFix's Melinda Newman described the song as a "loop-driven to getting down with your lady, who's taking off her clothes as quickly as she can". According to Eric Henderson of Slant Magazine, in "Cabaret", Timberlake compares the love to a burlesque and noted that the song resembles producer Timbaland's earlier work. Andy Kellman of Allmusic wrote that the song features Timbaland's signature sound and finds Timberlake proclaiming more "clever/nauseating" lyrics: "If sex is a contest, then you're coming first"; "'Cause I got you saying Jesus so much, it's like we're laying in a manger." The chorus consists of Timberlake singing "It's a cabaret" while being accompanied by Timbaland, who repeats "Put on a show, get on the floor". According to Stern, in his part with a duration about two minutes, Drake raps raunchy and fast-talking lines, "I'mma fuck you like we're having an affair". Nick Krewen of Toronto Star wrote that Drake raps lines "about a sexual tête-à-tête amidst a melee of scattershot rhythms". HotNewHipHop's Trevor Smith noticed the reference on Drake's verses to Lil Boosie's "Let Me Ease Your Mind".

 Critical reception 

"Cabaret" received generally positive reviews from music critics. Even though giving mixed review to the album, Kellman of Allmusic called the song a "standout". Anderson of Entertainment Weekly chose "Cabaret" as the best song on the album, labeling it a "slick drum orgy with a ferocious Drake cameo". Similarly, Julia Leconte of Now selected the song as a top track on the album and stated that it has catchy hook and cheesy lyrics which only Timberlake can pull off. Mesfin Fekadu of The Huffington Post wrote that "the song is smooth and has an addictive hook". John Meagher of Irish Independent labelled the song "highly potent" and noted that it features Timberlake's "typical heavy-hitting approach".Los Angeles Times's Wood praised Drake's verse and wrote that he "takes the sex talk to a level that Timberlake the boy-band veteran still can't". HitFix's Newman graded the song with a "B−" mark, and wrote that "Drake comes in for a rap that works perfectly with the song in their first collaboration". Dave Hanratty of Drowned in Sound stated that "Cabaret" feels "navel-gazing" as a result of Drake's braggadocios appearance and the mechanical input given by Timbaland. Entertainmentwise's Amy Gravelle stated that Drake is featured on the track to add substance and style and proves that he was the "hottest" rapper at the moment. A reviewer of Capital FM stated that the song proves why Drake was the rapper on everyone's lips and further described "Cabaret" as a smart team-up between the artists backed by Timbaland's classic beats. On the negative side, Lanre Bakare of The Guardian criticized the rapper's verse calling it "predictably self-indulgent". Vibe's Stacy-Ann Ellis noted that although Drake gives some "lover-boy swag" to the song, Jay-Z outperformed him with his verse on "Murder".

In a review of The 20/20 Experience - 2 of 2, Craig Manning of website AbsolutePunk wrote that even though the song features "a rapidfire" rap verse by Drake, both "Cabaret" and the lead single, "Take Back the Night", "feel somehow less impressive than a lot of the songs Timberlake was slinging last time around, if only because they don't add up to an 'experience' greater than the sum of their parts." According to Brice Ezell of PopMatters, "for whatever reason [the song] never gets off of the ground." Lydia Jenkin of New Zealand Herald opined that the song would be a lot of sexier without the overpowering bass pulses in its production and "some odd lyrics". Adelle Platon from Billboard dubbed the song "frisky" and Drake's verse "fit for a nightclub rendezvous." HotNewHipHop's Trevor Smith said "Cabaret" "it's a fitting addition to a solid catalogue that Timberlake has been developing since stepping foot (sic) in the game."

 Live performances 

Timberlake included "Cabaret" on the set list of his 2013-14 worldwide tour entitled The 20/20 Experience World Tour. In a review of the concert that took place at the United Center in Chicago on February 16, Claudia Perry of the Chicago Tribune wrote "the whole apparatus returned to the A position (hey, Timberlake likes golf) while he performed 'Cabaret' and 'Take Back the Night'."

 Credits and personnel 

Credits adapted from the liner notes of The 20/20 Experience – 2 of 2.
Locations
Vocals recorded and mixed at Jungle City Studios, New York City
Personnel

Timothy "Timbaland" Mosley — production
Justin Timberlake — vocals, mixing, production, vocal production, vocal arrangement
Jerome "J-Roc" Harmon — keyboards, production
Drake  — vocals
Daniel Jones — keyboards
Chris Godbey — engineering, mixing
Jimmy Douglass — mixing
Elliot Ives — recording, guitar

 Charts 

Following the release of The 20/20 Experience – 2 of 2'', "Cabaret" debuted on charts in South Korea and the US. The song debuted at number 50 in South Korea, with sales of 3,800 copies for that week ending October 5, 2013. Additionally, it debuted and peaked at number 18 on the US R&B Songs chart.

References 

2013 songs
Justin Timberlake songs
Drake (musician) songs
Song recordings produced by Jerome "J-Roc" Harmon
Song recordings produced by Justin Timberlake
Song recordings produced by Timbaland
Songs written by James Fauntleroy
Songs written by Jerome "J-Roc" Harmon
Songs written by Justin Timberlake
Songs written by Timbaland
Songs written by Drake (musician)